Social Security (Seafarers) Convention (Revised), 1987 is  an International Labour Organization Convention.

It was established in 1987, with the preamble stating:
Having determined that these proposals shall take the form of an international Convention revising the Sickness Insurance (Sea) Convention, 1936, and the Social Security (Seafarers) Convention, 1946,...

Ratifications 
The convention had been ratified by three states: Hungary (1989), the Philippines (2004), and Spain (2001). However, all three states have subsequently denounced the treaty.

External links 
Text.
Ratifications.

International Labour Organization conventions
Social security
Treaties entered into force in 1992
Treaties concluded in 1987
Treaties of the Hungarian People's Republic
Admiralty law treaties
1987 in labor relations